InnoTrans is the world's largest trade fair focused on the rail transport industry. It is held every two years at the Messe Berlin exhibition centre, which has outdoor standard gauge railway sidings which can be used to exhibit railway vehicles. During the weekend after the trade show the public can visit the rolling stock on display.

History 
InnoTrans has grown steadily in area and exhibitor numbers since it moved to Berlin in 1996. For the 2010 fair, organiser Messe Berlin Ltd announced an increase to 2,000 exhibitors from 44 countries, which covered the whole area of the exhibition centre for the first time.

A spin-off supplementary exhibition "Public Transport Interiors" aimed at the mass transit sector was planned, but the first event announced for 2011 was postponed until a later time. InnoTrans 2012 was instead the first to include a separate "Public Transport and Interiors Hall Forum", with a series of multimedia presentations on new design options in the industry.

InnoTrans trade fairs 

2022
 20 to 23 September 2022 in Berlin

2020
 Was to be 22 to 25 September 2020 in Berlin, but moved to 27 to 30 April 2021 because of the COVID-19 pandemic, and was moved again to 2022.

2018
 18 to 21 September 2018 in Berlin
 3062 exhibitors from 61 countries

2016

 20 to 23 September 2016 in Berlin (weekend public opening 24/25).
 Conference Corner where exhibitors, associations and transport companies can hold lectures and present papers. 
 2955 exhibitors from 60 countries.
 The summer-garden yard is opened to display electric buses and to allow a round driving course.

2014
 23 to 26 September 2014 in Berlin (weekend public opening 27/28)
 More than 2700 exhibitors from 51 countries. An InnoTrans Daily newspaper will be produced by Railway Gazette International
 Messe Berlin has constructed a further exhibition hall called the CityCube Berlin.
  in addition to the general ten standard gauge tracks a Special Gauge Display allows to show broad gauge and narrow gauge vehicles.
 List of rolling stock on show.

2012
 18 to 21 September 2012 in Berlin (weekend public opening 22/23)
 InnoTrans still grows – 2450 exhibitors from 47 countries were expected at InnoTrans 2012, which had five main segments: Railway Technology, Railway Infrastructure, Tunnel Construction, Interiors and Public Transport. More than 110,000 trade visitors are expected. An InnoTrans Daily newspaper will be produced by Railway Gazette International.
 List of rolling stock on show.

2010
 21 to 24 September 2010 in Berlin (weekend public opening 25/26)
 2,242 exhibitors from 45 countries
 106,612 trade visitors from 110 countries 
 81,000 square meters of exhibitions booths and 3,500 metres of railway track
 121 vehicles on show

2008
23 to 28 September in Berlin
1,912 exhibitors from 41 countries
80,000 trade visitors from 100 countries
150,000 square meters of exhibition area and 3,500 metres of railway track
91 vehicles on show. Contracts signed worth about €2 billion

2006
19 to 22 September in Berlin
1,606 exhibitors from 41 countries (50% from outside Germany)
64,422 trade visitors from 90 countries (40% of the visitors)
25,000 private visitors on the weekend public opening
50,591 square meters of exhibition area (1,868 metres of railway tracks)

2004
21 to 24 September in Berlin
1,369 exhibitors from 35 countries
44,968 trade visitors (14 300 from outside Germany; 21 000 private visitors on the weekend public opening)
40,468 square meters of exhibition area (1,868 metres of railway tracks)

2002
24 to 27 September in Berlin
1,045 exhibitors from 30 countries
35,686 trade visitors (9,385 from outside Germany 30,000 private visitors on the weekend public opening)
29,469 square meters of exhibition area

2000
12 to 15 September in Berlin
826 exhibitors (268 from outside Germany)
23,909 trade visitors (4.662 from outside Germany)
22,179 square meters of exhibition area

1998
28 to 30 October in Berlin
403 exhibitors (100 from outside Germany)
13,164 trade visitors (3,278 from outside Germany)
10,534 square meters of exhibition area

1996
15 to 20 October in Berlin
172 exhibitors (21 from outside Germany)
6,376 trade visitors (829 from outside Germany)
4,524 square meters of exhibition area

References

Website
 
 InnoTrans website

Events in Berlin
Rail transport in Berlin
Trade fairs in Germany
Railway culture